The Irish League in season 1902–03 comprised 8 teams, and Distillery won the championship.

Bohemians made their debut as the first club from Dublin in the Irish League.

League standings

Results

References
Northern Ireland - List of final tables (RSSSF)

1902-03
Ireland
Irish